Viktor Grigoryevich Kurentsov (5 April 1941 – 7 April 2021) was a Soviet middleweight weightlifter. He competed at the 1964 and 1968 Olympics and won a silver and a gold medal, respectively.

Born in Tukhinka, Syanno District, Vitebsk Region, then part of the Byelorussian SSR, in the Soviet Union, Kurentsov started training in weightlifting aged 18, while serving in the Soviet Army in the Russian Far East. By 1964 he became the world top middleweight weightlifter, winning a silver medal at the 1964 Olympics, five world titles in 1965–1970, and seven European titles in 1964–1971. He also won silver at the 1972 European Championships and bronze in 1974. Domestically Kurentsov won nine Soviet titles (1964–70, 1972, 1974). Between 1964 and 1968 he set 18 official world records.

After ending his weightlifting career Kurentsov continued to serve in the Soviet Army, retiring in 1990 as a colonel. He then became a politician and was elected to the Odintsovo city council. Between 1993 and 1998 he worked at the Russian embassy in Italy and later at the international relations office at the Odintsovo district government.

Kurentsov died on 7 April 2021, two days after his 80th birthday.

References

External links

1941 births
2021 deaths
People from Syanno District
Sportspeople from Vitebsk Region
Communist Party of the Soviet Union members
Medalists at the 1964 Summer Olympics
Medalists at the 1968 Summer Olympics
Olympic gold medalists for the Soviet Union
Olympic medalists in weightlifting
Olympic silver medalists for the Soviet Union
Olympic weightlifters of the Soviet Union
Weightlifters at the 1964 Summer Olympics
Weightlifters at the 1968 Summer Olympics
Honoured Coaches of Russia
Honoured Masters of Sport of the USSR
Recipients of the Order of the Red Banner of Labour
Belarusian male weightlifters

Soviet colonels
Soviet male weightlifters